Brave 6: Kazakhstan (also known as Brave 6 or 'Brave Kazakhstan') was a mixed martial arts event held live by Brave Combat Federation on Saturday April 28, 2017 at the Almaty Arena in Almaty, Kazakhstan. The event was broadcast live online and locally through Bahrain TV, ABS-CBN Sports and Action, Combate, Kazakh TV Claro Sports and OSN Sports.

Background

Brave 6: Kazakhstan was Brave Combat Federation's sixth card, the fourth to take place outside Bahrain, where the company headquarters is located, and the first one in Central Asia. In addition, Brave 6 was the first co-promotion in the event's history, promoted in partnership with the local promotion Qazaq FC.

The event had the first ever Women's MMA fight, between Mariya Agapova and Yulia Litvinceva, in the Flyweight division.

Júlio César "Morceguinho" was supposed to face Bakhtiyar Arzumanov in a main card featured bout but was forced to withdraw after being diagnosed with dengue fever. His opponent Arzumanov was kept on the card, but was also pulled a few days later after having his visa denied while entering Kazakhstan. The bout was then canceled.

Ikram Aliskerov was originally scheduled to face Ireland's Will Fleury in a main card featured bout but Fleury was forced to withdraw due to an injury. Fleury was then replaced by Azerbaijan's Rufat Asadov.

Fakhreddine vs Mafra cancellation 

After debuting with a win at Brave 4: Unstoppable, Lebanon's Mohammad Fakhreddine had a quick turnaround and was scheduled to face The Ultimate Fighter: Brazil season 1 veteran Leonardo Mafra in a welterweight bout.

However, Fakhreddine missed the weight during the official weigh-ins and Mafra failed to reach an agreement to compete against his opponent under these circumstances. Fakhreddine, on the other hand, was kept on the card and took a catchweight fight against Poland's Lukasz Witos in 81 kg.

Broadcast

The event was broadcast internationally online, through Brave's official website and YouTube channel, for free. In addition, the card was also broadcast in Bahrain through Bahrain TV, Middle East through OSN Sports, Kazakhstan through Kazakh TV, Hispanic America through Claro Sports, Brazil through Combate and Asia through ABS-CBN Sports and Action.

Broadcasting team

 Play-by-play commentator: Cyrus Fees
 Color Commentator: Nate Quarry
 Cage announcer: Carlos Kremer

Results

References

Mixed martial arts events